Khambieng Khamiar is a Laotian Olympic middle-distance runner. He represented his country in the men's 1500 meters and the men's 800 meters at the 1992 Summer Olympics. His times were a 2:02.45 and a 4:04.82.

References

External links
 

1967 births
Living people
Laotian male middle-distance runners
Olympic athletes of Laos
Athletes (track and field) at the 1992 Summer Olympics